Zangeneh is a surname. Notable people with the surname include:

Sheikh Ali khan Zangeneh (1669–1691), Iranian politician
Abdul Hamid Zangeneh (1899–1951), Iranian politician and scholar
Arman Zangeneh (born 1993), Iranian basketball player
Bijan Namdar Zangeneh (born 1953), Iranian politician
Pegah Zangeneh (born 1984), Iranian karateka

Persian-language surnames